Munyon is an unincorporated community in Imperial County, California. The Mulberry Elementary School is located in Munyon.

References

Unincorporated communities in Imperial County, California
Unincorporated communities in California